Rajko Čubrić (born 21 February 1958) is a Yugoslav former cyclist. He competed in the road race at the 1988 Summer Olympics.

References

External links
 

1958 births
Living people
Serbian male cyclists
Yugoslav male cyclists
Olympic cyclists of Yugoslavia
Cyclists at the 1988 Summer Olympics
Place of birth missing (living people)